Kathryn Elizabeth Wimp known professionally as Kay Davis (December 5, 1920 – January 27, 2012 in Apopka, Florida) was an American jazz singer who performed with the Duke Ellington orchestra.

Davis was born in Evanston, Illinois, and attended Evanston Township High School. She studied voice and piano at Northwestern University, where she received her bachelor's degree in 1942, and her master's degree in 1943. Her grandfather, William H. Twiggs, was a civic leader for whom a park in Evanston is named.

In 1944, she joined Duke Ellington's orchestra, where she sang alongside Joya Sherrill and Al Hibbler. She is best known for her wordless vocals in pieces such as "Transbluency" and "On a Turquoise Cloud." She also sang pieces with lyrics. She is the only person Ellington allowed to reprise Adelaide Hall's wordless vocal on "Creole Love Call." Davis and Billy Strayhorn gave the first performance of Strayhorn's "Lush Life" on November 13, 1948, at Carnegie Hall. With Ellington's orchestra, she appeared in the film shorts Symphony in Swing (1949) and Salute to Duke Ellington (1950), both for Universal-International.

Davis toured England with Ellington and Ray Nance in 1948, and in Europe with the full orchestra in 1950. After leaving Ellington's orchestra in 1950, she married Edward Wimp in 1952. They had one son, Edward L. Wimp. They retired to Florida.

Discography
 Duke Ellington, Black, Brown, and Beige (Bluebird, 1988)

References

 [ Kay Davis at Allmusic]

1920 births
2012 deaths
African-American women singers
American jazz singers
American women jazz singers
Bienen School of Music alumni
Duke Ellington Orchestra members
Evanston Township High School alumni